Frank Muehlheuser (July 2, 1926 – April 22, 2006) was an American football fullback and linebacker. He played for the Boston Yanks/New York Bulldogs from 1948 to 1949.

He died on April 22, 2006, at his home in Pittstown, New Jersey at age 79.

References

1926 births
2006 deaths
American football fullbacks
American football linebackers
Bloomfield High School (New Jersey) alumni
Colgate Raiders football players
Boston Yanks players
New York Bulldogs players
People from Alexandria Township, New Jersey
People from Irvington, New Jersey
Players of American football from New Jersey
Sportspeople from Essex County, New Jersey